Abbir Germaniciana also known as Abir Cella is the name of a Roman and Byzantine-era city in the Roman province of Africa proconsularis (today northern Tunisia).   The city was also the seat of a bishopric, in the ecclesiastical province of Carthage, and is best known as the home town of the Pre Nicaean father, Cyprian, who was bishop of Abbir Germaniciana around 250AD.

Location
The location of Abbir Germaniciana is unknown but: 
Adolf Harnack suggests it may have been near Membressa, in the Medjerda River Valley. 
Today Henchir el Naam, a location west of El Fahs and north of Theveste near lake Sebkhet el Kourzia, has support as the location of Abbir Maius. This would place the city on the Meliane Wadi.
Others, citing Roman sources, claim in the vicinity of Theveste, as Abbir Germaniciana is mentioned by the Geographer of Ravenna as just the Germana, and Antonine Itinerary as  Ad Germani, and both authors place it in the vicinity of Theveste. 
Which ever location it was in, it was definitely on along the coastal hinterlands of the Maghreb.
Still others suggest ruins of Ksour-el-Maïete near the Cherita and the Sebkhet de Sidi El Hani lakes, in southern Tunisia.

Bishopric
The town was also the seat of an ancient bishopric. The city appears to have been Catholic before the Diocletian Persecution but was taken into the Vandal Kingdom around 429 AD, and with the arrival of the Islamic armies at the end of the 7th century the bishopric ceased to effectively function.
In 1933 the diocese was re-established in name at least, as a titular see.

Known bishops
 St. Cyprian of Carthage fl 250.
Successus, the Bishop of Abbir Germaniciana Pope St. Sixtus II at New Advent Catholic Encyclopedia.  fl258. martyred
Annibonius (Catholic bishop) fl.411
Candidus (Catholic bishop) fl. 416–419
Felix fl436–484.
 Paul Bouque (1964–1976)
 Aloisio Sinesio Bohn of Brasília (1977–1980)
 Hermann Josef Spital of Münster (Germany) 1980–1981.
 Leo Schwarz, of Trier (Germany) 1982–2018

References

Ancient Berber cities
Roman towns and cities in Tunisia
Populated places in Béja Governorate
Catholic titular sees in Africa